Novonikolskoye is a rural locality (a selo) in Alexeyevsky Selsoviet, Blagovarsky District, Bashkortostan, Russia. The population was 282 as of 2010. There are two streets.

Geography 
Novonikolskoye is located 28 km northeast of Yazykovo (the district's administrative centre) by road. Moiseyevo is the nearest rural locality.

References 

Rural localities in Blagovarsky District